John C. Rao (born 1951) is a former associate professor of history at St. John's University, director of the Roman Forum/Dietrich von Hildebrand Institute, and former president of Una Voce America.

In 1977 Rao received his D.Phil. in Modern European History from Oxford University. Works include Americanism and the Collapse of the Church in the United States, Removing the Blindfold, and Periphery. He was a central interview subject for a PBS documentary on the annual Paris-Chartres Pilgrimage by traditionalist Catholics from around the world.

Rao has led the Roman Forum's annual symposium at Lake Garda.

Rao is a frequent contributor to The Remnant, a traditionalist Catholic biweekly. Rao is known for writing his columns from Rocco's Cafe, an Italian pastry shop in Greenwich Village Manhattan. As a traditionalist Catholic, he is a strong critic of neoconservatism in both politics and the Church.

References 

1951 births
Living people
American Roman Catholics
American traditionalist Catholics
Catholic Church in the United States
American writers of Italian descent
Alumni of the University of Oxford
St. John's University (New York City) faculty
21st-century American historians
21st-century American male writers
American male non-fiction writers